Severe Tire Damage is an American rock and roll "garage" band from Palo Alto, California, United States.

Innovation
Severe Tire Damage was the first band to perform live on the Internet. On June 24, 1993, the band was playing a gig at Xerox PARC while elsewhere in the building, scientists were discussing new technology (the MBone) for broadcasting on the Internet using livestreaming (known as multicasting at the time). As proof of their technology, the band was broadcast and could be seen live in Australia and elsewhere.

On Friday, November 18, 1994, the Rolling Stones decided to broadcast one of their concert tours on the Internet. Before their broadcast, Severe Tire Damage returned to the Internet, this time becoming the "opening act" for the Stones. Instead of an obscure Australian researcher, the entire world press was watching this time, and Severe Tire Damage was elevated from obscurity to Warholian fame.

Newsweek magazine described Severe Tire Damage as being "a lesser known rock band."
The Rolling Stones told The New York Times:
"the surprise opening act by Severe Tire Damage was a good reminder of the democratic nature of the Internet."

Band members 
The core band consisted of these people:
Russ Haines: guitar and vocals.  Haines worked at DEC Systems Research Center.
Mark Manasse: bass and vocals. Manasse worked at DEC Systems Research Center.
Steven Rubin: vocals.  Rubin worked at Apple Computer.
Mark Weiser: drums.  Weiser was Chief Technologist at Xerox PARC.

Additional people came and went during the band's history:
Ken Beckman: drums.  Beckman worked at DEC Systems Research Center.
Lance Berc: tech. support.  Berc worked at DEC Systems Research Center.
Bruce Donald: guitar.  Donald was a professor at Cornell University.
Hania Gajewska: band manager.  Gajewska worked at DEC Systems Research Center.
Brad Horak: Tech. support.  Horak worked at DEC Systems Research Center.
Joel Jewitt: Drums.
Anna Karlin: guitar and vocals. Karlin worked at DEC Systems Research Center and is now a professor at the University of Washington.
Berry Kercheval: Bass, tech. support. Kercheval worked at Xerox PARC.
Dexter Kozen: guitar, composer.  Kozen was a professor at Cornell University.
Amy Lansky: vocals.  Lansky worked at NASA Ames.
Ethan Robertson: sax and keyboards.
Daniel Scharstein: keyboards and drums.  Scharstein was a student at Cornell University.

Music 
Besides performing rock and roll standards, the band wrote a number of original songs that run the range from rock to punk.
These songs appears on their two albums: "Who Cares" (a full CD album) and "Trial Starter Kit" (a mini-CD with only 4 songs).  Both albums are out of print but are available on their collection CD "The Best We Can Do."

Downfall 
On April 27, 1999, Weiser died, and the band never fully recovered. For Rubin, this was the second band in which the drummer had died, making his life into a Spinal Tap-like experience.  For a brief time afterward silicon valley drummer Joel Jewitt practiced with the band and played some local gigs; as of March 2010 Jewitt was believed to be alive. Rubin and Haines continue to keep score on dead drummers; currently (2020) Haines is ahead of Rubin three to two.

References

External links 
Official band website
Computer Chronicles episode "Internet" (1995) with Severe Tire Damage performing live at four minutes into the program

Garage rock groups from California
Garage punk groups